David Wimleitner (born 21 January 1976) is a former Austrian professional footballer who played as a goalkeeper. He has had two spells as caretaker manager of FC Blau-Weiß Linz.

External links 

Living people
1976 births 
Austrian footballers
Austrian Football Bundesliga players
FC Blau-Weiß Linz players
LASK players
Association football goalkeepers
FC Blau-Weiß Linz managers